Reinhart is a given name or surname, and may refer to:

Surname 
Anna Barbara Reinhart (1730–1796), Swiss mathematician
Annie Reinhart (1942–2004), American politician from Missouri
Art Reinhart (1899–1946), Major League Baseball pitcher from 1919-1928
Arthur Reinhart (born 1965), Polish cinematographer, film editor and producer
Benjamin Franklin Reinhart (1829–1885), American painter
Carmen Reinhart (born 1955), American economist
Carole Dawn Reinhart (born 1941), American musician and educator
Charles Stanley Reinhart (1844–1896), American painter and illustrator
Fabio Reinhart (born 1942), Swiss architect
Gregory Reinhart (born 1951), American opera singer
Griffin Reinhart (born 1994), Canadian professional ice hockey player
Haley Reinhart (born 1990), American singer
Jake Reinhart, American photographer from Pittsburgh, Pennsylvania
Johann Christian Reinhart (1761–1847), German painter and etcher
John Reinhart (born 1981), American poet and musician
Joseph Reinhart (1851–1911), American businessperson
Lili Reinhart (born 1996), American actress
Lucian Athanasius Reinhart (1911–1950), president of De La Salle College in Manila, Philippines
Matthew Reinhart (born 1971), American writer and illustrator
Max Reinhart (born 1992), Canadian ice hockey player
Michele Reinhart, American politician
Nicole Reinhart (1976–2000), American professional cyclist
Oskar Reinhart (1885–1965), Swiss arts patron and art collector
Paul Reinhart (born 1960), Canadian ice hockey player
Peter Reinhart, American baker, educator, and author
Roy Herbert Reinhart (1919–2005), US paleontologist
Sam Reinhart (born 1995), Canadian professional ice hockey player
Stanley Eric Reinhart (1893–1975), senior United States Army officer
Tanya Reinhart (1944–2007), Israeli linguist
Vincent Reinhart (born 1957), American economist
Werner Reinhart (1884–1951), Swiss philanthropist, music patron
William Reinhart (1896–1971), American college sports coach

Fictional characters 
Jeff Reinhart-Denlon, a fictional character from the Saw series
Jürg Reinhart, fictional character of the Swiss writer Max Frisch
Dylan Reinhart (disambiguation), several characters

Given name 
Reinhart Ahlrichs (1940–2016), German theoretical chemist
Reinhart Dozy (1820–1883), Dutch Arabic scholar of French origin
Reinhart Fuchs (1934–2017)
Reinhart Heinrich (1946–2006), German biophysicist
Reinhart Hummel (1930–2007), German theologian
Reinhart Koselleck (1923–2006), German historian
Reinhart Langer (1921–2018), New Zealand botanist
Reinhart Maurer (born 1935), philosopher and professor from Xanten, Germany
Reinhart Probst (born 1957), professional tennis player from Germany
Reinhart Steinbicker (1904–1935), German screenwriter and film director

See also 
 Reinhart Field
 Rinehart (disambiguation)
 Reinhardt (disambiguation)
 Reinhard

Germanic given names
German masculine given names
Dutch masculine given names
Germanic-language surnames
German-language surnames
Jewish surnames
Surnames from given names